The European Senior Men's Championship is a European amateur golf championship for men over 50 (previously 55) organized by the European Golf Association. 

The inaugural event was held in 1996, with 25 editions have been contested so far. It is now played annually in conjunction with the European Senior Ladies' Championship.

Format
The championship is opened to players aged above 50 years old.

The format of this competition consists of three rounds of stroke play, with a cut after the second round out of which the lowest 54 men's scores can qualify for the final round.

Past results

Source:

Nations Cup
From 2000 to 2006, a Nations Cup was contested. This was discontinued when a separate European Senior Men's Team Championship was introduced. 

Source:

See also
European Senior Ladies' Championship – corresponding EGA event for women
U.S. Senior Amateur – corresponding USGA event

References

External links
European Golf Association: Full results

Amateur golf tournaments
Senior golf tournaments
Team golf tournaments 
European Golf Association championships
Recurring sporting events established in 1996